Guillermo León Valencia Airport  is an airport serving Popayán, the capital city of the Cauca Department in Colombia. It took the name of former President of Colombia Guillermo León Valencia Muñoz.

Airlines and destinations

See also
Transport in Colombia
List of airports in Colombia

References

External links 
OurAirports - Popayán
FallingRain - Guillermo León Valencia Airport

Airports in Colombia
Buildings and structures in Cauca Department
Popayán